The 2022 AFF Women's Championship was the 12th edition of the AFF Women's Championship, an international women's football tournament organised by the ASEAN Football Federation (AFF). The final tournament was originally scheduled to run from 3 to 17 July 2020. However the tournament was postponed indefinitely due to the COVID-19 pandemic. The tournament was later rescheduled and was held from 4 to 17 July 2022 in the Philippines.

Vietnam were the defending champions, but failed to defend the title after losing 0–4 to the Philippines in the semi-finals. The hosts went on to win their first title in history by defeating Thailand 3–0 in the final.

Participating nations
Eleven teams entered the AFF Women's Championship final tournament. Australia decided to send its under-23 squads to compete in the tournament.

Draw
The draw for the 2022 AFF Women's Championship was held on May 28, 2022, at the Marco Polo Ortigas Manila in Pasig. The teams were allocated into five pots based on their performances in the last edition of the tournament. Ten teams were first drawn into two groups of five teams. Malaysia, the eleventh team was drawn separately, making one of the two groups have six teams after the whole draw was finalized.

Venues
Matches will be held in three venues.

Squads

Group stage

Tiebreakers
Ranking in each group shall be determined as follows:
 Greater number of points obtained in all the group matches;
 Goal difference in all the group matches;
 Greater number of goals scored in all the group matches;
 Greater disciplinary points.
If two or more teams are equal on the basis on the above four criteria, the place shall be determined as follows:
 Result of the direct match between the teams concerned;
 Penalty shoot-out if only the teams are tied, and they met in the last round of the group;
 Drawing lots by the Organising Committee.

All times listed are Philippine Standard Time (UTC+08:00)

Group A

Group B

Knockout stage

Semi-finals

Third place match

Final

Goalscorers

Awards

Final ranking

See also
 2022 AFC Women's Asian Cup
 2022 CAFA Women's Championship
 2022 EAFF E-1 Football Championship (women)
 2022 SAFF Women's Championship
 2022 WAFF Women's Championship

References

2022
AFF Women's Championship
Aff Women's Championship
AFF Women's Championship
W
2022 in Asian football